The Richmond Revolution was a professional indoor football team based in Richmond, Virginia that played in the Indoor Football League from 2010 to 2011. For the 2010 season, they played their home games at the Arthur Ashe Athletic Center.  Because of space issues at that facility the owner decided to move onto the SportsQuest campus in nearby Chesterfield for the 2011 season and play all home games outdoors, since the proposed arena had not yet been built.

However, in late August, Richmond BizSense's writer Aaron Kremer (8/25/11) reported that Charlie Hildbold, the general manager, was laid off. He had moved to Virginia to help launch the indoor arena football team. According to Steve Burton, the owner of the team, Richmond Revolution will sit out the 2012 season and be reinstated in 2013. Scott Bass a writer for Style Weekly reported (3/9/2011) nearly half of the 40 players on the Raiders' training camp roster for 2011 defected from Richmond Revolution, as well as the Revolution's head coach, Steve Criswell. On February 9, 2012 the Virginia attorney general's office filed a civil suit against SportsQuest, the company that owns the Revolution.

This was Richmond's third attempt at trying to build a long lasting indoor professional football team. The demise of Richmond Revolution left the Richmond Raiders the only team in the area. Previous teams were the Richmond Speed of the Af2 and the Richmond Bandits of the AIFL.

When the team was first organized a name-the-team contest was held on the SportsQuest webpage.  Nominations continued until August 11, 2009, with the five finalist names Blitz, Rush, Rivermen, Revolution, and Reign chosen the next day.  Voting continued until August 21 with the Revolution name unveiled on August 24.

The Indoor Football League announced on June 23, 2010, that the Revolution had won the 2010 IFL Franchise of the Year award.  In addition the team also took home the League's Media Relations of the Year.  Revolution QB Bryan Randall was named the 2010 IFL Most Valuable Player, and head coach Steve Criswell was named the IFL Coach of the Year. Later in the Steve Criswell left the team and on October 7, 2010, Richmond Revolution announced their new head coach would be former local standout Tony Hawkins.  Hawkins is the all-time leading passer in Virginia State University history.

Season-by-season

|-
| colspan="6" align="center" | Richmond Revolution (IFL)
|-
|2010 || 13 || 1 || 0 || 1st Atlantic East || Lost Round 1 (Rochester)
|-
|2011 || 3 || 11 || 0 || 3rd Atlantic || --
|-
!Totals || 16 || 13 || 0
|colspan="2"| (including playoffs)

Notable players

Final roster

Awards and honors
The following is a list of all Revolution players who have won league Awards

All-IFL players
The following Revolution players have been named to All-IFL Teams:
 OL Derek Stoudt (1)
 DL Jason Holman (1)
 DB Demarcus James (1)

Staff
Owner: SportsQuest
President of Sales/Operations: Mark F. Wood
Assistant GM/VP of Sports Operations: Charlie Hildbold
Head Coach: Tony Hawkins
Defensive Coordinator: Kevin Coles
Defensive Assistant/Special Teams: Larry Long
Offensive Assistant/Equipment Mgr: Mike Bonner
Mascot: George The Eagle

References

External links
 Richmond Revolution Official Website

Former Indoor Football League teams
Sports in Richmond, Virginia
American football teams in Virginia